Spirit of Vengeance may refer to:

 Spirit of Vengeance (comics), a Marvel Comics character
 Ghost Rider: Spirit of Vengeance, a 2012 film